A domusculta (plural - domuscultae) was a papal estate in Italy in the Middle Ages, or the large villa complex at the centre of such an estate.  An example is the Domusculta Capracorum of Pope Hadrian I.  They were similar to the papal patrimonia of the same period.

Medieval Italy
Economic history of the Holy See
Catholicism in the Middle Ages
Papal States